You Made It is an American television program on ZDTV, which was later renamed to TechTV, from 2000 to 2001 that showcased video clips that were created by the show's viewers. The 30 minute program, filmed in San Francisco, California, was hosted by Michaela Pereira.

External links

References 

TechTV original programming
2000 American television series debuts
2001 American television series endings
2000s American reality television series